In mathematics, an axiomatic theory is one based on axioms.

Axiomatic may also refer to:

 Axiomatic (book), a collection of short stories by Greg Egan
 Axiomatic (album), a 2005 album by Australian band Taxiride

See also
 Axiom (disambiguation)